Kepler-26e is an exoplanet orbiting the star Kepler-26, located in the constellation Lyra. It was discovered by the Kepler telescope in February 2014. It orbits its parent star at only 0.220 astronomical units and completes an orbit once every 46.8 days. It is potentially habitable.

References

Kepler-26
Super-Earths
Exoplanets discovered by the Kepler space telescope
Exoplanets discovered in 2014